Hayden James is the self-titled debut extended play (EP) by Australian indie pop singer, Hayden James. The five-track EP was released independently on 30 August 2013, and provided two singles, "Permission to Love" (July 2013) and "Embrace" (September). "Permission to Love" peaked at No. 19 on the ARIA Australian Artists Singles chart and No. 7 on the ARIA Hitseekers Singles chart.

Reception 

Ruben Seaton from ToneDeaf said; "The EP is beautifully balanced around the much-celebrated first single 'Permission to Love', which relies on masterfully warped vocals, minimalistic synth taps and sharp percussion claps."

Track listing 

 "Beginnings" – 3:38
 "Lay Down" – 4:35
 "Permission to Love" – 4:24
 "No Time" – 3:53
 "Embrace" – 4:02

Charts

Release history

References 

2013 debut EPs
Hayden James albums
Indie pop EPs
EPs by Australian artists